Almost Astronauts: 13 Women Who Dared to Dream is a nonfiction children's book by Tanya Lee Stone, originally published February 24, 2009 by Candlewick Press, then republished September 27, 2011. The book tells the story of the Mercury 13 women, who, in 1958, joined NASA and completed testing to become astronauts.

The book won the Bank Street College Flora Stieglitz Straus Award and Robert F. Sibert Informational Book Medal.

Reception 
Almost Astronauts received a starred review from Kirkus, as well as positive reviews from Booklist, The New York Times Book Review, The Bulletin of the Center for Children's Books, and Publishers Weekly.

Kirkus wrote, "The author offers great insight into how deeply ingrained sexism was in American society and its institutions. Handsomely illustrated with photographs, this empowering story will leave readers inspired." Publishers Weekly said, "Readers with an interest in history and in women's struggle for equality will undoubtedly be moved." Speaking for The Bulletin, Elizabeth Bush said, "Readers prone to outrage over civil rights denied can plan on losing plenty of sleep over this one."

The audiobook, narrated by Susan Ericksen, received a positive review from Booklist.

References 

2009 children's books
2009 non-fiction books
Candlewick Press books
Mercury 13